
Gmina Horyniec-Zdrój is a rural gmina (administrative district) in Lubaczów County, Subcarpathian Voivodeship, in south-eastern Poland, on the border with Ukraine.

Villages
Gmina Horyniec-Zdrój contains the villages and settlements of Dziewięcierz, Horyniec-Zdrój, Krzywe, Mrzygłody Lubyckie, Nowe Brusno, Nowiny Horynieckie, Podemszczyzna, Polanka Horyniecka, Prusie, Radruż, Werchrata and Wólka Horyniecka.

Neighbouring gminas
Gmina Horyniec-Zdrój is bordered by the gminas of Cieszanów, Lubaczów, Lubycza Królewska and Narol. It also borders Ukraine.

References

Polish official population figures 2006

Horyniec-Zdroj
Gmina Horyniec Zdroj